"If I Hated You" is a song co-written and performed by American pop singer Fletcher; issued as the second single from her third extended play The S(ex) Tapes. The song was produced by Malay, who also served as co-writer.

Music video

The official music video for "If I Hated You" was directed by Shannon Beveridge (Fletcher's ex-girlfriend).

Chart positions

References

External links
 

2020 songs
2020 singles
Capitol Records singles
Fletcher (singer) songs
Music videos directed by Shannon Beveridge
Song recordings produced by Malay (record producer)
Songs written by Fletcher (singer)
Songs written by Malay (record producer)
Songs written by Mozella